Alexander Michael Beckett (born 19 February 1954) is a former Scottish footballer who played as a defender.

Beckett is best known for his time with St. Mirren where he made 195 league appearances with the Paisley side, he also played for Falkirk and Queen of the South.

Beckett was inducted into the St. Mirren F.C. Hall of Fame in 2008.

References

1954 births
Living people
St Mirren F.C. players
Queen of the South F.C. players
Scottish footballers
Association football defenders